Millot was a French automobile built by the Millot brothers in 1896.

Millot may also refer to:

People:
Adolphe Philippe Millot (1857 – 1921), French painter, lithographer and entomologist
Catherine Millot (born 1944), French Lacanian psychoanalyst and author, professor.
Charles Millot (circa 1717 – 1769), cleric
Charles Millot (1921 – 2003), actor 
Charles-Théodore Millot (1829 – 1889), French general 
Claude-François-Xavier Millot (1726 – 1785), French churchman and historian
Claude Dubois-Millot, sales director
Éric Millot (12 December 1968), French figure skater
Estelle Millot (born 1993), a member of France women's national water polo team
Jean-François Millot (born 1944), French sprint canoer
Jordan Millot (born 1990), French professional footballer
Nicolas Millot (d. 1590 or later), French composer 
Vincent Millot (born 1986), French tennis player.

Other uses:

Léon Millot, red grape used for wine